Wisconsin Death Trip is the debut studio album by American heavy metal band Static-X, released on March 23, 1999, by Warner Bros. Records. The band was formed after lead singer Wayne Static and drummer Ken Jay met at a Virgin Records store in Chicago. After being introduced by the Smashing Pumpkins lead singer Billy Corgan, the two decided to head out west to California to enlist a lead guitarist and bassist. Once in California, Koichi Fukuda became guitarist, and not long after, they discovered Californian Tony Campos to complete the lineup as their bassist. Warner Bros. Records discovered the band in California and signed them in February 1998.

Wisconsin Death Trip peaked at number 107 on the US Billboard 200 and number one on the Top Heatseekers chart, and was certified platinum by the RIAA in 2001. Three singles were released from the album: "Push It", "I'm with Stupid", and "Bled for Days".

Background
The album was produced by Ulrich Wild in a matter of eight weeks with a budget of $50,000; the band originally wanted Terry Date to produce, but couldn't afford him, so they opted for his assistant Wild. The band wanted very "machine-like" sounding drums, but without the use of a drum machine: instead, they built their own triggering system from pieces of plywood and piezo microphones to record the kick, snare and toms into Opcode Vision. The cymbals were then played separately on top. Samples were programmed in by Static in an Alesis HR-16, while synth lines were produced by Fukuda with a Roland MC-303.

It features a song written by vocalist Wayne Static and drummer Ken Jay's former band Deep Blue Dream, titled "December". The crash-landing scene from the 1968 film Planet of the Apes was sampled in the intro of "Sweat of the Bud". The intro for "Stem" was sampled from the 1990 experimental horror film Begotten. A sample of dialogue from actress Linnea Quigley from the 1988 film Sorority Babes in the Slimeball Bowl-O-Rama appears in the outro of "I'm with Stupid".

Title
The album's title was taken by the band from Michael Lesy's 1973 book of the same name during a stay at Static's sister Lisa's apartment during a tour when they spotted the book on her table. Originally, the band - at the time called "Static", which management deemed too common to be service marked - wanted to use the title as the band name, but the label deemed it too long.

The book, responsible for capturing the imaginations of the band and inspiring the album title, contains a collection of photographs cataloging deceased persons previously residing in the Black River Falls region in the late 19th century. When interviewed about the source of the title, Wayne Static explained, "[It's] actually a book title that we stole. It's been out of print for about 20 years. It's a historical book about life in this small town in Wisconsin from 1890 to 1900. And it's about everything that happened, but it focuses on people dying and how they died. And there are pictures of dead people as well as stuff about natural disasters and fires and stuff like that."

Reception

CMJ included the album in its "Loud Rock '99 Top 5" list, saying, "Static-X's industrial/metal hybrid uses a guitar sound that keeps its songs refreshingly large, loud and groovable." In 2018, Revolver include the album on their list of "20 Essential Nu-Metal Albums". At AllMusic, Tim Sheridan called it "Fast, cheap, and out of control. This is gutbucket thrash for the most jaded of teenaged parking lot dwellers." Robert Christgau claimed it was "Horrorshow abuse in living stereo--they mean it, man." In 2021, it was named one of the 20 best metal albums of 1999 by Metal Hammer magazine.

Singles
"Push It" was the first single released from the album. The song features an array of sounds from industrial metal to the band's "evil disco" style. Mick Olszewski directed the music video for the song, using clay figures along with shots of the band.

"I'm with Stupid" was released as the second single from the album. The song kicks off with Wayne Static bellowing out the chorus and then transitions to the lead guitar riff. David Meyers directed the song's music video, featuring creatures from the previous video. The video also includes Wayne Static playing a woman, and monkeys hidden throughout. This song, along with "Push It", is credited with Wisconsin Death Trips success.

"Bled for Days" was released as the final single from the album, although technically it was the first song released off the album on the Bride of Chucky soundtrack. It was the auditioning song for Nick Oshiro's enlistment into the band. The music video is composed of recordings from live shows, and the audio was spliced with the original album version.

In popular culture
"Push It" was used in the intro for the 2000 video game Duke Nukem: Land of the Babes, was included in the soundtrack for the 1999 film Idle Hands and was featured in the 2004 film Torque. A remix of the song "Love Dump" appeared on the soundtrack to the 2001 film Valentine, as well as the 2009 video game Brütal Legend. In 2008, "Push It" was made available as downloadable content in the music game Rock Band. "Otsegolation" was featured in the soundtrack for the American release of Omega Boost in 1999, and "Bled for Days" was included in the soundtrack for the films Bride of Chucky and Universal Soldier: The Return.

Track listing

Personnel
Credits taken from the CD liner notes.

Static-X 
Wayne Static – lead vocals, rhythm guitar, programming
 Ken Jay – drums
 Koichi Fukuda – lead guitar, keyboards, programming
 Tony Campos – bass, backing vocals

Technical 
 Ulrich Wild - producer, engineer, mixing at Master Control, Burbank, CA
 Michael "Elvis" Baskette - recording assistant
 Jeff Robinson - mixing assistant
 Tom Baker - mastering at Future Disc

Charts

Certifications

References

1999 debut albums
Albums produced by Ulrich Wild
Warner Records albums
Static-X albums